Edward Augustine McGuire (28 August 1901 – 27 October 1992) was an Irish independent politician, businessman and tennis player. He was educated at Clongowes Wood College and Douai School. He was a member of Seanad Éireann from 1948 to 1965. He was nominated by the Taoiseach to the 6th Seanad in 1948. He was elected to 7th Seanad in 1951 by the Industrial and Commercial Panel, and re-elected in 1954, 1957 and 1961. He lost his seat the 1965 Seanad election. He was also the owner of Brown Thomas Department store in Grafton Street, Dublin.

References

1901 births
1992 deaths
Independent members of Seanad Éireann
Members of the 6th Seanad
Members of the 7th Seanad
Members of the 8th Seanad
Members of the 9th Seanad
Members of the 10th Seanad
Nominated members of Seanad Éireann
Irish male tennis players